Sinfonia antartica ("Antarctic Symphony") is the Italian title given by Ralph Vaughan Williams to his seventh symphony, first performed in 1953. It drew on incidental music the composer had written for the 1948 film Scott of the Antarctic.

Background and first performances
By the mid-1940s, Vaughan Williams had written five symphonies of widely varying characters, from the choral Sea Symphony (1909) to the turbulent and discordant Fourth (1934) and the serene Fifth (1943), which some took to be the septuagenarian composer's symphonic swan song. In the event there were four more symphonies to come; his Sixth was premiered in 1948. After completing it, Vaughan Williams undertook a substantial film score to accompany Scott of the Antarctic produced by Michael Balcon and directed by Charles Frend. The composer became deeply interested in and moved by the story of the disastrous polar expedition of Robert Falcon Scott and his companions, and music suggested by ice and wind, penguins and whales came into his head. Before even seeing the film script he had composed most of the score. His biographer Michael Kennedy writes that the autograph full score contains 996 bars of music, of which about half was used in the finished film.

While writing the film music, Vaughan Williams had begun to feel that it might later form the basis of a symphony. He worked on that intermittently during the next few years, between other major compositions including his opera The Pilgrim's Progress. By early 1952 the symphony was complete. His musical assistant Roy Douglas played a piano arrangement to a group of musicians including Arthur Bliss, Gerald Finzi and Edward Dent; also in the group was Ernest Irving, who had commissioned the film score and to whom Vaughan Williams dedicated the new symphony. An orchestral score was sent to Sir John Barbirolli, who had secured the composer's agreement that he should conduct the premiere. The work was first given in public on 14 January 1953 at the Free Trade Hall, Manchester, by Barbirolli and the Hallé Orchestra and Choir with Margaret Ritchie in the wordless soprano solo. The performers repeated the performance at the same venue the following evening, and gave the London premiere at the Royal Festival Hall on 21 January. The title of the symphony was changed at the last minute from Sinfonia Antarctica to Sinfonia Antartica, so as to use consistently Italian spelling in the two words.

The first American performance was given on 2 April 1953 by the Chicago Symphony Orchestra conducted by Rafael Kubelík. The Australian premiere was given by the Sydney Symphony Orchestra conducted by Eugene Goossens on 17 June 1953.

Score notes 
The work is scored for a large orchestra including:
Woodwinds: three flutes (3rd doubling on piccolo), two oboes, cor anglais, two clarinets, bass clarinet, two bassoons, contrabassoon 
Brass: four horns, three trumpets, three trombones, tuba
Percussion: timpani, side drum, bass drum, cymbals, triangle, gong, bells, xylophone, glockenspiel, vibraphone, wind machine  
Keyboards: celesta, piano, organ (in the third movement)
Strings: harp, and strings
Voices: (first and last movements) soprano solo, three-part women's chorus.

Mechanics of the composition 
A typical performance lasts around 45 minutes. There are five movements. The composer specified that the third movement lead directly into the fourth. The score includes a brief literary quotation at the start of each movement. They are sometimes declaimed in performance (and recordings), although the composer did not say that they were intended to form part of a performance of the work.

1. Prelude: Andante maestoso
 To suffer woes which hope thinks infinite,/ To forgive wrongs darker than death or night,/ To defy power which seems omnipotent,/ ... / Neither to change, nor falter, nor repent:/ This ... is to be/ Good, great and joyous, beautiful and free,/ This is alone Life, Joy, Empire and Victory. (quotation from Shelley, Prometheus Unbound)

2. Scherzo: Moderato
 There go the ships, and there is that Leviathan whom thou hast made to take his pastime therein. (quotation from Psalm 104, Verse 26)

3. Landscape: Lento
 Ye ice falls! Ye that from the mountain's brow/ Adown enormous ravines slope amain —/ Torrents, methinks, that heard a mighty voice,/ And stopped at once amid their maddest plunge!/ Motionless torrents! Silent cataracts! (quotation from Coleridge, Hymn before Sunrise, in the vale of Chamouni)

4. Intermezzo: Andante sostenuto
 Love, all alike, no season knows, nor clime,/ Nor hours, days, months, which are the rags of time. (quotation from Donne, The Sun Rising)

5. Epilogue: Alla marcia, moderato (non troppo allegro)
 I do not regret this journey; we took risks, we knew we took them, things have come out against us, therefore we have no cause for complaint. (quotation from Captain Scott's Last Journal)

Occasionally in performance and recordings the preceding quotations are recited before each movement; on record they included Sir Adrian Boult's first recording for Decca with Sir John Gielgud (supervised by the composer) in 1954, and André Previn's for RCA with Sir Ralph Richardson.

Recordings

Notes, references and sources

Notes

References

Sources

Further reading
Beckerman, Michael (Spring 2000). "The Composer as Pole Seeker: Reading Vaughan Williams's Sinfonia antartica." Current Musicology, no. 69, pp. 42–67.
Grimley, Daniel M. (Spring-Summer 2008). "Music, Ice, and the 'Geometry of Fear': The Landscapes of Vaughan Williams's 'Sinfonia Antartica.'" The Musical Quarterly, vol. 91, nos. 1-2, pp. 116–150.
Mason, Colin. (March 1953). "Vaughan Williams's 'Sinfonia Antartica.'" The Musical Times, vol. 94, no. 1321, p. 128.

External links
 

Symphony 007
Music for orchestra and organ
1952 compositions